Tersa is a rural locality (a selo) and the administrative center of Tersinskoye Rural Settlement, Yelansky District, Volgograd Oblast, Russia. The population was 1,540 as of 2010. There are 20 streets.

Geography 
Tersa is located on Khopyorsko-Buzulukskaya Plain, on the bank of the Tersa River, 8 km southeast of Yelan (the district's administrative centre) by road. Zhuravka is the nearest rural locality.

References 

Rural localities in Yelansky District
Atkarsky Uyezd